Drillia pselia is a species of sea snail, a marine gastropod mollusk in the family Drilliidae.

Description
The length of the shell attains 15 mm, its diameter 4.5 mm.

Distribution
This species occurs in the demersal zone off the Cape Province, South Africa.

References

  Barnard K.H. (1958), Contribution to the knowledge of South African marine Mollusca. Part 1. Gastropoda; Prosobranchiata: Toxoglossa; Annals of The South African Museum v. 44 pp. 73–163
  Tucker, J.K. 2004 Catalog of recent and fossil turrids (Mollusca: Gastropoda). Zootaxa 682:1–1295

External links
 

Endemic fauna of South Africa
pselia
Gastropods described in 1958